Rob Hollink (born 27 March 1962 in Enschede, Netherlands) is a professional poker player based in Groningen. He has won both a European Poker Tour (EPT) title and World Series of Poker bracelet, becoming the first person from the Netherlands to do so, first was at the EPT's inaugural Grand Final of the European Poker Tour in Monte Carlo in 2005 and then he won his first bracelet at the 2008 World Series of Poker in the $10,000 Limit Hold'em World Championship, becoming the first Dutch bracelet winner.

Before poker
Prior to playing poker professionally, Hollink played tennis, football (soccer) and basketball when he was a kid, but injuries prevented his career from progressing as far as he wanted. Rob Hollink has been a professional gambler since 1985. After winning a poker-tournament in Paris in 2001, Hollink decided to stop playing black-jack and roulette and proceeded as a poker professional.

Poker career
His numerous Omaha tournament wins include:
 HFl 400 Pot Limit Omaha at the Master Classics of Poker 2001, Amsterdam - HFl 90,763 ($37,187)
 €500 Pot Limit Omaha at the Austrian Masters 2002, Vienna - €25,220 ($23,523)
 €3,000 Pot Limit Omaha at the Euro Finals of Poker 2003, Paris - €122,440 ($131,798)
 €250 Pot Limit Omaha at the World Heads-Up Poker Championship 2004, Barcelona - €23,000 ($27,855)

Rob also made the final table of the Pot Limit Omaha tournament at the 2003 World Series of Poker (WSOP).

On 7 August 2003 the opening event of the 2003 World Championship of Online Poker, a $109 buy-in heads up No Limit tournament, was won by Hollink for a $12,800 first prize, using the screen name 'batoelrob.'

In no limit hold'em events, Rob has finished in the money of two World Poker Tour (WPT) events:
 12th in the Grand Prix de Paris 2004 - €19,000 ($23,167)
 5th in the Season 3 WPT Championship - $377,420

One of his greatest wins was defeating the 211 player field at the €10,000 European Poker Tour Grand Final in Monte Carlo, where he took home the €635,000 ($845,190) grand prize. Fellow Dutch poker player Marcel Lüske had tipped him to win the event shortly before.

In 2005, Hollink won 4 tournaments, he won the European tournament performance of the year and was also chosen as European poker player of the year

In June 2008, Rob Hollink won the $10,000 World Championship Limit Hold'em at the World Series of Poker in Las Vegas, earning $496,931.

Since 2001, Rob Hollink won 14 tournaments out of 44 final tables in live poker-tournaments.

Since 2007, Rob Hollink has been a poker-instructor at www.nederpoker.com

In 2010, his total live tournament winnings exceed $3,100,000. His 24 cashes at the WSOP account for $890,659 of those winnings.

World Series of Poker bracelets

References

External links
 World Poker Tour profile
 Hendon Mob tournament results

1962 births
Dutch poker players
European Poker Tour winners
Living people
Sportspeople from Enschede
World Series of Poker bracelet winners